Pale green triangle may refer to:

 Graphium eurypylus, a swallowtail butterfly commonly known as the great jay or pale green triangle
 Graphium evemon, a sister species commonly known as the lesser jay but sometimes also referred to as the pale green triangle

Animal common name disambiguation pages